David Zima (born 8 November 2000) is a Czech professional footballer who plays as a defender for Serie A club Torino and the Czech Republic national team.

Club career 
On 1 February 2020, Zima joined Slavia Prague on loan from Sigma Olomouc for the remainder of the season, with an option to make the move permanent, after just two league appearances for Sigma Olomouc. On 31 August 2021, Zima signed for Italian club Torino for a reported fee of €5 million.

International career
Zima made his debut for the Czech Republic national team on 24 March 2021 in a World Cup qualifier against Estonia.

Career statistics

Club

References

External links 
 

2000 births
Sportspeople from Olomouc
Living people
Czech footballers
Association football defenders
Czech Republic youth international footballers
Czech Republic under-21 international footballers
Czech Republic international footballers
Czech First League players
Serie A players
SK Sigma Olomouc players
SK Slavia Prague players
Torino F.C. players
Czech expatriate footballers
Expatriate footballers in Italy
UEFA Euro 2020 players